The Duck Creek is a river in Ontonagon County, Michigan.

See also
List of rivers of Michigan

References

Rivers of Michigan